Keith Hodiak is a Guyanese-born, British-based actor who was active on British TV and film between 1978 and 1992.

Emigrating to the UK from Guyana in 1960, he became interested in dance when Lee Edwards visited his school in Stoke Newington to work with pupils to put together performance shows. After encouragement from Edwards, Hodiak was awarded a scholarship to train at Arts Educational Schools. This was followed by spending a year working in Germany before joining Ballet Rambert, at the time under director Norman Morrice.

His acting debut came in 1978, when he took on the role of Sam Spade in Revenge of the Pink Panther. In 1983, he played the part of the Raston Warrior Robot in the 20th anniversary special of Doctor Who – The Five Doctors. In 1985, he appeared in three episodes of Are You Being Served? during the programme's final year on air. He played one of Aslan's two satyrs in the BBC's adaptation of The Lion, the Witch and the Wardrobe in 1988. He briefly appeared in EastEnders in 1992, but gave up acting to become an adult ballet class instructor and yoga teacher, working notably at Pineapple Dance Studios.

Filmography

References

External links

Keith Hodiak at Theatricalia
Keith Hodiak - Rambert (list of performances with Ballet Rambert)

English male film actors
English male television actors
Living people
Year of birth missing (living people)
Black British male actors
20th-century English male actors
Guyanese emigrants to the United Kingdom